Bar Aftab-e Milas (also Romanized as Bar Āftāb-e Mīlās, Bar Aftāb-e Mīlās, and Bar Aftāb Mīlās) is a village in Milas Rural District, in the Central District of Lordegan County, Chaharmahal and Bakhtiari Province, Iran. At the 2006 census, its population was 885, in 159 families.

References 

Populated places in Lordegan County